Deerfield Beach High School (DBHS) is a public high school in Deerfield Beach, Florida. It is part of the Broward School District and has an enrollment of approximately 2,400.

The school features the IB Middle Years Programme or Pre-IB, which is a prerequisite for the International Baccalaureate program that offers college-level academics to students in 11th and 12th grade. Deerfield has historically been a leader among Broward County schools in terms of the number of students winning the prestigious Silver Knight Awards. The graduation rate for the 2014–2015 academic year stood at 79.0% compared to the 74.5% state average and the 81.0% national average. In that same year, students scored an average of 1590 out of 2400 on the SAT (compared with a national average of 1720) and a 22 out of 36 (compared with a national average of 26) on the ACT. Deerfield Beach High has an FCAT school grade of "A" for the 2014–2015 academic school year.

On Saturday, September 6, 2014, the school's street address officially changed from 910 SW 15th Street to 910 Buck Pride Way
This transition occurred with the assistance of the City of Deerfield Beach, members of the Deerfield Beach Community, The Home Depot, Kiwanis, People's Trust Insurance Company, DBHS Student Government, Class of 2015, and DBHS Employees.

The school serves, in addition to much of Deerfield Beach, Hillsboro Beach, Lighthouse Point, and sections of Pompano Beach.

Urban Teacher Academy Program 
The Urban Teacher Academy Program (UTAP) is a magnet program aimed at training students to become teachers and community leaders. The minimum program requirements for entry and retention are maintaining a GPA of 2.0 and FCAT test scores of 3 or higher.

Athletics

Baseball
Basketball
Cheerleading
Cross Country
Flag Football
Football
Golf
Soccer
Softball, Varsity
Swimming and Diving
Tennis
Track and Field
Volleyball
Water Polo
Wrestling

Demographics
As of the 2021–22 school year, the total student enrollment was 2,333. The ethnic makeup of the school was 52.9% Black, 1% White, 30.3% Hispanic, 2.8% Asian, 0.2% Pacific Islander, 2.7% Multiracial, and 0.4% Native American or Native Alaskan.

Notable alumni 
 Jeremy Kellem: Arena Football League player
 Stockar McDougle (1996): American football linebacker in the NFL (2000–2006) selected in the first round of the 2000 NFL Draft; played for the Detroit Lions (2000–2004), Miami Dolphins (2005) and Jacksonville Jaguars (2006)
 Jason Pierre-Paul (2007): American football defensive end in the NFL; played for the New York Giants (2010–2017), the Tampa Bay Buccaneers (2018–2021), and the Baltimore Ravens (2022–present); first-round 2010 NFL Draft pick; winner of Super Bowl XLVI
 Denard Robinson (2009): American football running back in the NFL for the Jacksonville Jaguars. Former quarterback for the University of Michigan (2009–2012),
 Brandon Powell (2014): American football wide receiver in the NFL for the LA Rams. Former wide receiver for the Florida Gators.
 Jerry Jeudy (2016): American football wide receiver in the NFL for the Denver Broncos. Former wide receiver for the Alabama Crimson Tide.
 Riley Ridley (2016): American football wide receiver in the NFL for the Chicago Bears. Former wide receiver for the Georgia Bulldogs.
 Aaron Robinson (2016): American football corner back in the NFL for the New York Giants. Former corner back for the UCF Knights.
 Mike Fiers (2003): Major League Baseball pitcher
 Alex Jacob (2002): professional poker player
 Elton Nesbitt (2000): basketball player who has played in the NBA Development League and internationally
 Kelly Skidmore (1981): Democratic Florida State Representative for Florida's 90th House district (2006–2010), 81st House district (2020–present)
 Mickey Storey, Major League Baseball player
 Teri Weigel, pornographic actress.
 Antoine McColister (Ace Hood), rapper.
 Julius Jenkins (1999): Professional basketball player for Science City Jena of the Basketball Bundesliga

Notable faculty
Allen West, A Republican U.S. Representative for Florida's 22nd congressional district (2011-2013) and lieutenant colonel in the United States Army, taught U.S. history at Deerfield Beach High in the 2004–2005 school year.

References

External links 
 School District
 Deerfield Beach High School

Broward County Public Schools
High schools in Broward County, Florida
Public high schools in Florida
International Baccalaureate schools in Florida
Deerfield Beach, Florida
1970 establishments in Florida
Educational institutions established in 1970